Eriogonum jamesii is a species of wild buckwheat known by the common name James' buckwheat and antelope sage. It is native to the southwestern United States, being found in: Colorado, Utah, Arizona, Texas, New Mexico, Oklahoma, and Nebraska.

Uses
The Navajo people have used Eriogonum jamesii as an oral contraceptive. Among the Zuni people, the root is soaked in water and used as a wash for sore eyes. The fresh or dried root is also eaten for stomachaches. The root is carried in the mouth for a sore tongue and then buried in a river bottom. The ground blossom powder is given to ceremonial dancers impersonating anthropic gods to bring rain.

References

External links
description at the University of Maryland, College Park PlantSystematics.org
images from Four Corners Wildflowers
Plants for a Future entry

jamesii
Flora of the Southwestern United States
Flora of Colorado
Flora of New Mexico
Flora of Oklahoma
Flora of Texas
Flora of Utah
Flora of the Rocky Mountains
Flora of the Sonoran Deserts
Plants used in traditional Native American medicine
Flora without expected TNC conservation status